The Natural History of Parking Lots is a 1990 American independent film written and directed by Everett Lewis. It tells the story of two estranged brothers who seek to reconcile their relationship against a background of criminal activity and violence. The film is Lewis' feature film debut.

Plot
In Los Angeles the late 1980s, 17-year-old Chris is arrested for stealing a car. His distant father (who insists his sons call him "Sam" and not "Dad") arranges for him to be bailed into the custody of Chris's older brother, Lance. The brothers seem to bond, but there is the suspicion that Lance is merely using his newly-domestic situation as a cover for his real business, gun-running.

Cast 

 Charlie Bean as Chris
 B. Wyatt as Lance
 Charles Taylor as Sam
 Dean Cleverdon as Cop

Reception 
Critic Emanuel Levy said the film’s "visual style owes a lot to the early works of French New Wave". He added, "Mood and tone one are far more important than text or plot, which are slender, underdeveloped, often feeling arbitrary in the order which the sequences unfold and are presented. However, visually, the stylized black-and-white picture is impressive, courtesy of cinematographer Hisham Abed, compensating for the performances of Wyatt and Bean, which are decent but no more; Bean, in fact, has never acted before, but he’s blessed with a likable and vulnerable screen persona."

Awards and nominations
The film was nominated for a 1991 Independent Spirit Award for Best First Feature. At the Torino International Film Festival the film won the Audience Award for Best Feature Film and the Prize of the City of Torino Award for Feature Film.

Notes

External links
 Official site of Everett Lewis
 The Natural History of Parking Lots at The Internet Movie Database
 The Natural History of Parking Lots at Rotten Tomatoes

1990 films
1990 directorial debut films
1990 drama films
1990 independent films
Films directed by Everett Lewis
Films about brothers
Films set in the 1980s
Films set in Los Angeles
1990s English-language films
American independent films
1990s American films